Christopher "Chris" Smith, also known as the Peacemaker, is a fictional antihero in the DC Extended Universe (DCEU) media franchise, based on the Charlton / DC Comics character of the same name. Adapted for film by writer/director James Gunn, he is portrayed by John Cena. Smith operates as a vigilante who aims to achieve peace at any cost, which results in a 30-year prison sentence at Belle Reve Penitentiary. He is approached by the facility's warden and the director of A.R.G.U.S., Amanda Waller, to join a strike team composed of other inmates on an infiltration mission en route to the remote island of Corto Maltese. Upon turning on his teammates and being incapacitated during the mission, he is nursed back to health by A.R.G.U.S. and sent on another mission immediately afterwards, now being tasked with accompanying a group of alumni from A.R.G.U.S. to prevent a world-threatening epidemic known as "Project Butterfly".

As of 2022, the character is a central figure in the franchise, having appeared in two projects thus far: the feature film The Suicide Squad (2021) and the first season of the eponymous HBO Max streaming television series Peacemaker. The character will return for the latter's second season.

Character development and execution

Background 
In October 2018, James Gunn was hired by Warner Bros. to write and direct a planned sequel to the DC Extended Universe film Suicide Squad (2016), after he had just been fired from Walt Disney Studios Motion Pictures as writer/director of the Marvel Cinematic Universe (MCU) film Guardians of the Galaxy Vol. 3 (2023), in light of a series of controversial tweets he had made many years prior that he would later apologize for. While he would be almost immediately reinstated by Disney and Marvel Studios following his hiring by Warner Bros. & DC Films, his commitment to his engagement with the latter studios meant that production on Vol. 3 would have to be pushed back significantly to accommodate for his projects with DC, with Marvel Studios president Kevin Feige encouraging Gunn to make "a great movie" during a discussion regarding his prioritization of the latter project, and pushing the production start date for the former film into 2021.

Gunn's Suicide Squad film, eventually titled The Suicide Squad, was intended to act as a relaunch of the IP and characters as opposed to a direct sequel to the previous film directed by David Ayer, that would take the franchise in a new direction and feature a largely new cast. Roven and Peter Safran were set as producers, with Zack Snyder and Deborah Snyder as executive producers. Safran had pushed for Gunn to take on the project, feeling that there was no better director than him to "bring together a disparate group of outsiders on a mission".

Adapting Peacemaker to film and television 

Among the new characters that would be part of the film's revised team lineup, James Gunn selected the character Peacemaker, originally created by Joe Gill and Pat Boyette for appearances in Charlton Comics publications prior to the character's absorption into DC Comics alongside other Charlton properties in the 1985 crossover event storyline "Crisis on Infinite Earths", which would integrate Peacemaker into the main DC Universe. Gunn was initially looking to cast Dave Bautista in the role, as the two had previously collaborated on the Guardians of the Galaxy films in the MCU franchise with Bautista's portrayal of Drax the Destroyer. However, Bautista was unavailable for the role due to taking the lead role of Zack Snyder's Army of the Dead (2021).

Fellow WWE alumni John Cena entered talks to portray the character in April 2019, as Gunn had wanted to work with Cena upon seeing his performance in the romantic comedy Trainwreck (2015), and had been looking for an appropriate role for him for a while. Cena had previously auditioned unsuccessfully for roles in both Marvel and DC Comics-based films, notably being rejected for both Cable in Deadpool 2 (2018) and the titular character in Shazam! (2019), in addition to various MCU roles. He would however, be openly passionate about working on a project with James Gunn, reflecting in January 2022 that,

During the promotion of The Suicide Squad, Cena decided to wear the Peacemaker costume for interviews and other promotional events as a way to familiarize the audience with the lesser-known character, which was a tactic that he had previously used when he was a professional wrestler.

After finishing work on The Suicide Squad, Gunn began working on a spinoff series about the origins of Peacemaker "just for fun" during his COVID-19 lockdown isolation. He brought the idea to producer Peter Safran, who was later approached by DC Films to create a Suicide Squad spinoff series. The Peacemaker series was eventually picked up by HBO Max in September 2020, with Gunn writing all eight episodes of the first season and directing five of them. Cena agreed to reprise the role for the series in 2020, becoming an executive producer with Gunn and Safran. As a result, Peacemaker, who was originally intended to die in The Suicide Squad, was kept alive for the series, and a post-credits scene was filmed in January 2021 for the film in order to set up Peacemaker, which also began filming around that time. Following the first season's success, a second season of Peacemaker was ordered in 2022.

Characterization
Cena would describe his character as "a douchey Captain America", with Gunn adding that the character would go to as many lengths as possible to achieve peace. Upon being cast, Gunn would also tell Cena not to read any comics featuring Peacemaker to develop background knowledge with the character, as having a preconceived notion of what the character could be would distract from the story Gunn wanted to tell. Cena would paraphrase Gunn in an interview as saying, "you have what I’m looking for. Just be yourself, and if you’re willing to take direction, I think we can do something special." Cena originally envisioned the character as "a drill sergeant, Full Metal Jacket-esque personality", with the actor being told to change direction and emphasize his "do-gooder side" about 20 minutes into filming his first scene in-costume. Cena during the same interview, would contrast his acting career in regards to this role, to his career as a professional wrestler, stating that "Whenever I play a role in a movie, it really is never myself. Whereas WWE is the odd thing that a lot of times you have to create an extension of yourself because the narrative is just so damn long".

Despite being portrayed as self-righteous, duty-driven, and egotistical in The Suicide Squad and continuing to flaunt that facade in Peacemaker, Smith is in actuality a broken, self-loathing man trying to find a purpose in the world, but is too haunted by the horrible actions he committed to adjust in a normal environment. Smith's time with the 11th Street Kids, as portrayed in the series, allows him to slowly come to terms with his past demons and reconsider his world views, showing his vulnerable side more often to others and learning to process his repressed emotions, but also becoming more emotionally unstable and prone to bursts of anger. Viewers noted that Peacemaker received less character development in The Suicide Squad compared to other characters such as Robert DuBois / Bloodsport, Cleo Cazo / Ratcatcher 2, and King Shark, and that the Peacemaker was considered "irredeemable" in the film, but this was intended by Gunn to set the character's development in his eponymous series. Gunn used the series as an opportunity to explore current world issues through the title character, in addition to expanding on his relationship with his father, which was alluded to in the film.

The decision to make Smith bisexual, confirmed by the penultimate episode of the first season of Peacemaker, was floated by Cena, according to Gunn. He states that "Peacemaker is an interesting character because he's so fucked-up in so many ways, and then in other ways, he is kind of weirdly forward-thinking. John does improv all the time, and he just turned Christopher Smith into this hyper-sexualized dude that is open to anything sexually. I was surprised by that. But I thought, 'I guess it makes sense that this guy isn't one-dimensional.'" Cena examined the history of the character in the comics and determined that with Christopher Smith's childhood struggles and hardships, he would be "willing to do anything to a certain extent."

Fictional character biography

Early life 
Christopher "Chris" Smith was born in Evergreen, Charlton County in Washington state to August "Auggie" Smith, a former soldier turned former vigilante operating under the alias of White Dragon who was infamous for his nature as a white supremacist and his neo-Nazi beliefs. Auggie trained Chris to kill at a young age against his will, permanently warping his sense of morality. Chris would soon accidentally cause the death of his brother Keith, whom Auggie favored greatly over Chris, deeply angering the former and traumatizing the latter.

As he grew up, Chris became mentally unstable, swearing an oath to keep the peace at any cost, regardless of the means he would use to achieve it and how many people he would have to kill. In pursuit of this, he creates his own uniform and adopts the alias "Peacemaker" as he begins his pursuit for justice by any means necessary. Along the way, Chris befriends local crimefighter Adrian Chase, also known as "Vigilante" and encounters future Justice League members the Flash and Wonder Woman in person, with one of his first major activities including the apprehension of a criminal called "Kite Man". After he begins killing criminals and other civilians in the name of peace, Chris is arrested and sentenced to 30 years at Belle Reve Penitentiary.

Task Force X and Project Starfish

While imprisoned, Chris is recruited by A.R.G.U.S. director Amanda Waller into a privately sanctioned strike team of imprisoned metahumans and criminals codenamed "Task Force X". The squad is tasked with a mission in Corto Maltese to eliminate an anti-American regime that has overthrown the island's government and destroy a Nazi-era laboratory named Jötunheim, which contains the secret experiment "Project Starfish". After a faction of team members led by Col. Rick Flag are quickly killed in action, Chris, alongside his comrades - Robert DuBois / Bloodsport, Cleo Cazo / Ratcatcher 2, Nanaue / King Shark and Abner Krill / Polka-Dot Man - infiltrate Corto Maltesean from a separate beach as Flag and surviving member Harley Quinn are captured by the Freedom Fighters, a Corto Maltese resistance group and the island's new government, respectively.

The second squad locate Flag at a resistance movement base camp and convince the rebellion's leader, Sol Soria, to assist them in the coming conflict. Sometime after retrieving Quinn from a compound occupied by the Corto Maltese regime, they capture the lead scientist in charge of Project Starfish, the Thinker, who assists them in breaking into Jötunheim, allowing Chris, Harley, DuBois, Krill, and Nanaue to rig the facility with explosives while Flag and Cleo accompany Thinker to the laboratory.

Thinker reveals to Flag and Cleo that Project Starfish involved the capture and experimentation of an extraterrestrial being known as Starro, who was brought to Earth by the U.S. government, which had secretly funded the project for decades, after making a secret deal with the Corto Maltesean government, while using thousands of Corto Maltesean natives as unwitting test subjects. Flag, horrified by the ethical implications, decides to take the hard drive containing the project's details and leak it as evidence. However, he is confronted and killed by a remorsefully Chris, who was secretly under orders from Waller herself to cover up the U.S.'s involvement in the project. As a skirmish between the other squad members and the Corto Maltese military leads to Krill prematurely detonating the explosives, Cleo takes the drive while Chris attempts to execute her. DuBois intervenes, saving Cazo and shooting Chris, leaving him with near-fatal injuries while Cleo, DuBois and the rest of their teammates flee the crumbling facility with the drive.

As the remaining Task Force X members kill the now-freed Starro and save Corto Maltese, a separate group from Belle Reve is dispatched to retrieve Chris from Jötunheim's ruins and return him to Charlton County. Following Starro's defeat and the dissolution of the squad, two of Waller's associates, John Economos and Emilia Harcourt, visit Evergreen Hospital to check on Chris's recovery, with Harcourt proclaiming that keeping him alive is important as he will be needed to "save the world again".

Project Butterfly

Meeting Clemson Murn and encountering a Butterfly 

Upon being released from intensive care five months later and returning to his nearby trailer home, Chris is approached by a team consisting of Economos, Harcourt, new recruit and Waller's daughter, Leota Adebayo, and spearheaded by an informant of Waller's named Clemson Murn. Murn briefs Chris and the team on parasitic aliens codenamed Butterflies and arranges a group meeting later that evening. Chris then visits Auggie, who supplies his son with new helmets. Following the briefing, Chris engages in a one-night stand with Annie Sturphausen, who is possessed by a Butterfly and attacks him. He kills her using his "sonic boom helmet", but the local police, headed by detective Sophie Song, are alerted to the incident and investigate. Harcourt and Adebayo assist Chris in evading them until Economos accidentally incriminates Auggie in the crime, leading to the latter's unintended arrest and incarceration.

Assassinating the Goff Family 

Upon being shunned by the team for the incident, Chris returns home and meets with Chase, during which they collectively discover that a device belonging to Sturphausen is actually a miniature spaceship. The following day, Murn briefs the team on their first ops mission, directing them to assassinate United States Senator Royland Goff and his family, who are presumed to all be Butterflies. Smith and Harcourt infiltrate the Goff home, but Chris hesitates to execute Goff's family. Chase volunteers to do so, but before he can kill Goff, the team is attacked by Goff's bodyguard Judomaster, who knocks out Harcourt and captures Chris and Chase for questioning. Goff attempts to goad Chris into confessing intel by torturing Chase, but Harcourt, Murn, and Adebayo intervene, allowing Chris to free himself and kill Goff while Economos incapacitates the escaping Judomaster. After a butterfly emerges from Goff's corpse, Chris secretly captures it and claims he killed it.

Interrogating Judomaster 

As the team bring Judomaster back to their hideout to interrogate him, Chris and Chase learn of Auggie's arrest. Despite Murn and Adebayo telling him otherwise, Chris visits Auggie in prison, where the latter threatens to expose Project Butterfly to the authorities. Following this, Chris and Adebayo discover Judomaster in the midst of escaping. Following a lengthy confrontation between Chris and Judomaster, Adebayo abruptly shoots the latter as he is about to reveal the Butterflies' true purpose. Disillusioned, Chris returns to his trailer and grieves over his having to kill Flag and Keith's death.

Glan Tai infiltration and Butterfly takeover 

Auggie pleads his innocence to Song, who deduces Chris killed Sturphausen. Concurrently, Chris is briefed on the Butterflies' parasitic nature and their desire to feed on an amber-like fluid. A discovery Adebayo made the previous night leads Project Butterfly to the Glan Tai bottling facility, where they kill the Butterfly-possessed workers and an escaped zoo gorilla and Chris earns the team's respect. While bonding on the way back, Chris invites Adebayo over to his trailer, where she secretly replaces his personal diary with a replica under Waller's orders.

Song arranges for Auggie's release and Chris' arrest, much to the dismay of Deputy Locke, who is secretly collaborating with Murn unbeknownst to the rest of the team. The Goff butterfly attempts to communicate with Chris and Chase just as the Evergreen police come to arrest the former. While escaping to Project Butterfly's hideout with Locke's help, Chase accidentally drops the jar containing "Goff", allowing it to escape and kills and possess Song while Locke receives Chris' diary. As Economos traces the Butterflies' activities back to Coverdale Ranch, where the team suspects that they are utilizing a giant alien larva, or "cow", to mass-produce the fluid, Adebayo both experiences guilt over hiding confidential information about the operation from Chris and Waller and discovered that Murn is a rogue Butterfly called Ik Nobe Lok, which Harcourt and Economos are already aware of, who wants to stop his own species, who came to Earth after they killed their own planet, from enslaving humanity, which he also revealed that the Goff butterfly is actually the queen, Eek Stack Ik Ik. Elsewhere, "Goff" summons an army of Butterflies to possess the Evergreen Police Department and Evergreen Corrections Center while Auggie rallies a group of followers and reassumes his White Dragon alias to kill Chris, who watches a television broadcast wherein the possessed Locke publicly incriminates him using his "diary" and calls for his arrest.

Facing his father and the Cow 

Feeling betrayed by his companions, Chris decides to find and eliminate the "cow" himself. However, the team is intercepted by Auggie and his followers. Chris's pet eagle Eagly attempts to save Chris only to be injured by Auggie, who nearly executes Chris. Chase exposes a weak point in Auggie's armor, allowing Chris to overpower and reluctantly kill him. Project Butterfly reunite at a nearby veterinary clinic, where Eagly is treated for his injuries and they learn "Murn" was killed by the Butterfly-possessed police officers. The team elects Harcourt as their new leader, who briefs them on the Butterflies' objective to teleport the "cow" to another enclave and leave to stop them.

Upon reaching Coverdale Ranch and after Chris and Chase learned about Adebayo's true parentage and "Murn's" true identity, the team improvise a plan due to a shortage of time. After Economos fails to remotely kill the Cow, Chris, Harcourt, and Chase launch a frontal assault, eliminating multiple Butterflies, though Harcourt and Chase are grievously injured. Meanwhile, Smith confronts "Goff", who attempts to sway him to the Butterflies' cause by revealing the Butterflies originally came to Earth seeking refuge before realizing that the planet was at the mercy of humans attempting to profit off of its resources and shifting their goals towards assimilating humanity and guiding them towards peace. Aggravated, Chris launches Adebayo at the Cow using his "human torpedo" helmet so she can destroy it while he kills Butterfly-Locke and Song's body, sparing "Goff".

In the aftermath, Harcourt, Economos, and Chase undergo medical treatment while Adebayo and Chris make amends. Inspired, she publicly leaks Project Butterfly and Waller's role in Task Force X, clearing Chris' name. As he returns home with Eagly and "Goff" however, he becomes haunted by a hallucination of Auggie.

Reception

Reviews
Cena's portrayal of Christopher Smith / Peacemaker across his appearances in the DCEU has received positive reactions. Speaking on his performance in The Suicide Squad, Katie Rife, writing for The A.V. Club, stated that "Cena once again proves himself to be a talented comedic actor" in the role, describing the character as a "living action figure". Justin Chang of the Los Angeles Times would further add that Cena's performance as his "ironically named" character wound up adding "to a terrific ensemble and a deft balance of brains, heart and other viscera". Commenting on the chemistry between Cena's Peacemaker and Idris Elba's character Robert DuBois / Bloodsport, CNET's Richard Trenholm observed that a constant positive throughout the film was "The pair clashing hilariously as they try to one-up each other in homicidal creativity", further complimenting Cena as being "so good and so funny as the uptight Peacemaker, he seems like an entirely different actor from the block of wood who fell off the screen with a dull thunk in this year's Fast and Furious 9".

Critics similarly welcomed Cena's performance in Peacemaker the following year. IGN writer Samantha Nelson observed the progression in characterization in the series, contemplating that "Peacemaker quickly becomes a significantly more sympathetic character than he was in Gunn’s film, even if he is exasperating to his teammates such as Belle Reve warden John Economos (Steve Agee), who Peacemaker constantly accuses of dying his beard." She further comments that "Cena has a great sense of humor and seemingly no shame as he plays a sad-sack heel whose best friend is his bald eagle sidekick, Eagly".       Charles Bramesco of The Guardian highlighted Cena as "the show’s strongest attribute", attributing it to "his veiny musculature lending a much-needed weight to face-offs that falter when ramping up the plastic-looking CGI". He likens Cena's presence and prowess in the series to physical comedy, iterating that "the bass has been cranked into the red every time he hits a wall or floor, letting us feel the heaviness of his elephantine body. He’s well-suited to the role as a budding comic performer too, his alpha-man-boy bluster the ideal fit for Gunn’s sophomoric hijinks".

Audience viewership
According to Samba TV, 638,000 US households watched John Cena in the premiere episode in its first 4 days of streaming on HBO Max.

See also
Characters of the DC Extended Universe
Peacemaker cast and characters

References
 The fictional character biography and portions of the characterization were adapted from Peacemaker, The Suicide Squad, and respective pages for episodes of Peacemaker (TV series) at DC Extended Universe Wiki, which are available under a Creative Commons Attribution-Share Alike 3.0 license.

External links 

American male characters in television
DC Comics male superheroes
DC Comics LGBT superheroes
DC Extended Universe characters
Fictional bisexual males
Fictional characters from Washington (state)
Fictional diarists
Fictional fratricides
Fictional LGBT characters in television
Fictional marksmen and snipers
Fictional mass murderers
Fictional mercenaries
Fictional patricides
Fictional prisoners and detainees in the United States
Fictional vigilantes
Film characters introduced in 2021
Male characters in film
Peacemaker (comics)
Suicide Squad (film series)
Superhero film characters
Superhero television characters
Male film villains
United States-themed superheroes
Film supervillains